Elections to Armagh City and District Council were held on 21 May 1997 on the same day as the other Northern Irish local government elections. The election used four district electoral areas to elect a total of 22 councillors.

Election results

Note: "Votes" are the first preference votes.

Districts summary

|- class="unsortable" align="centre"
!rowspan=2 align="left"|Ward
! % 
!Cllrs
! % 
!Cllrs
! %
!Cllrs
! %
!Cllrs
! % 
!Cllrs
!rowspan=2|TotalCllrs
|- class="unsortable" align="center"
!colspan=2 bgcolor="" | UUP
!colspan=2 bgcolor="" | SDLP
!colspan=2 bgcolor="" | Sinn Féin
!colspan=2 bgcolor="" | DUP
!colspan=2 bgcolor="white"| Others
|-
|align="left"|Armagh City
|25.3
|2
|bgcolor="#99FF66"|38.1
|bgcolor="#99FF66"|2
|25.9
|2
|8.1
|0
|2.6
|0
|6
|-
|align="left"|Crossmore
|30.8
|1
|bgcolor="#99FF66"|49.4
|bgcolor="#99FF66"|3
|19.8
|0
|0.0
|0
|0.0
|0
|5
|-
|align="left"|Cusher
|bgcolor="40BFF5"|59.5
|bgcolor="40BFF5"|4
|14.3
|1
|4.8
|0
|21.4
|1
|0.0
|0
|6
|-
|align="left"|The Orchard
|bgcolor="40BFF5"|49.7
|bgcolor="40BFF5"|3
|24.5
|1
|9.4
|0
|16.4
|1
|0.0
|0
|5
|- class="unsortable" class="sortbottom" style="background:#C9C9C9"
|align="left"| Total
|42.0
|10
|30.8
|7
|14.6
|3
|11.9
|2
|0.7
|0
|22
|-
|}

Districts results

Armagh City

1993: 3 x SDLP, 2 x UUP, 1 x Sinn Féin
1997: 2 x SDLP, 2 x UUP, 2 x Sinn Féin
1993-1997 Change: Sinn Féin gain from SDLP

Crossmore

1993: 4 x SDLP, 1 x UUP
1997: 3 x SDLP, 1 x UUP, 1 x Sinn Féin
1993-1997 Change: Sinn Féin gain from SDLP

Cusher

1993: 4 x UUP, 1 x DUP, 1 x SDLP
1997: 4 x UUP, 1 x DUP, 1 x SDLP
1993-1997 Change: No change

The Orchard

1993: 3 x UUP, 1 x DUP, 1 x SDLP
1997: 3 x UUP, 1 x DUP, 1 x SDLP
1993-1997 Change: No change

References

1997 Northern Ireland local elections
1997 City and District Council election
1997
May 1997 events in the United Kingdom